Guanyin Gumiao Temple (also known as the Guangdong Guanyin Temple) is one of two major Chinese temples located within Latha Township in Yangon's Chinatown. It was founded by the Cantonese community of Yangon in 1823, but was destroyed by a fire in December 1855, and subsequently rebuilt in 1864, with two additional brick buildings to the side built in 1872. The temple is located on Maha Bandula Road and is dedicated to Guanyin, a Buddhist bodhisattva corresponding to the Burmese Buddhist bodhisattva Avalokiteśvara (Lawka Nat).

References

See also
Kheng Hock Keong Temple
Fushan Temple
Long Shan Tang Temple

Buddhist temples in Yangon
19th-century Buddhist temples
Guanyin temples